"Merrily We Roll Along" is a song written by Charlie Tobias, Murray Mencher, and Eddie Cantor in 1935, and used in the Merrie Melodies cartoon Billboard Frolics that same year. It is best known as the theme of Warner Bros.' Merrie Melodies cartoon series.

The first two lines of Cantor's recording are:
Merrily we roll along, my honey and me
Verily there's no one half as happy as we

In the 1970s, it was adopted by WGN as the theme music for The Ray Rayner Show, which featured Warner Bros. cartoons. In 1995, it was used as the closing theme of The Sylvester & Tweety Mysteries.

The song shares a title with the 1934 play Merrily We Roll Along by George S. Kaufman and Moss Hart, but is unrelated to it. The song is also an introduction to all the Guns N' Roses concerts in their tour Not in This Lifetime... Tour.

The old folk song "Goodnight, Ladies" contains the line "Merrily we roll along", which is often used as a child's nursery rhyme. The tune from the first line of the Tobias-Mencher-Cantor song matches that line from "Goodnight, Ladies", but the tunes diverge from there.

External links
A website containing Cantor's recording of the song

Looney Tunes songs
Songs written by Charles Tobias
1935 songs
Animated series theme songs
Comedy television theme songs
Children's television theme songs